Asoristan ( Asōristān, Āsūristān) was the name of the Sasanian province of Assyria and Babylonia from 226 to 637.

Name
The Parthian name Asōristān (also spelled Asoristan, Asuristan, Asurestan, Assuristan) is known from Shapur I's inscription on the Ka'ba-ye Zartosht, and from the inscription of Narseh at Paikuli. The adjective āsōrīg in Middle Persian accordingly means “Assyrian”. The region was also called several other names: Assyria, Athura Bēṯ Armāyē, Bābēl / Bābil, and Erech / Erāq. After the mid-6th century it was also called Khvārvarān in Persian.

The name Asōristān is a compound of Asōr ("Assyria") and the Iranian suffix -istān ("land of"). The name Assyria, in the form Asōristān, was shifted to include ancient Babylonia by the Parthians, and this continued under the Sasanians. The historical country of Assyria (Athura), however, lay to the north of Babylonian Asoristan, in the independent frontier province of Osroene.

History
During the Achaemenid (550–330 BCE) and Parthian Empires (150 BCE – 225 CE), this region had been known by the Old Persian name Athura. Asōristān, Middle Persian "land of Assyria", was the capital province of the Sasanian Empire and was called Dil-ī Ērānshahr, meaning "Heart of Iran". The city of Ctesiphon served as the capital of both the Parthian and Sasanian Empire, and was for some time the largest city in the world. The main language spoken by the Assyrian people was Eastern Aramaic, with the local Syriac language becoming an important vehicle for Syriac Christianity. The Church of the East was founded in Asōristān. Asōristān was largely identical with ancient Mesopotamia. The northern border is somewhat uncertain but probably went along a line from Anta to Takrīt. Ḥīra was probably the southernmost point, the border then following the northern part of the swamps of Wasit.

The Parthians had exercised only loose control at times, allowing for a number of Assyrian kingdoms to flourish in Upper Mesopotamia in the form of independent Osroene, Adiabene, Beth Nuhadra, Beth Garmai and the partly Assyrian state of Hatra, and Assyriologists such as Georges Roux and Simo Parpola opine that ancient Assur itself may have been independent during this time. 

The Sasanian Empire conquered Assyria and Mesopotamia from the Parthians during the 220s, and by 260 had abolished these independent Assyrian city-states and kingdoms, with the 3000-year-old city of Assur being sacked in 256. Some regions appear to have remained partly autonomous as late as the latter part of the fourth century, with an Assyrian king named Sinharib reputedly ruling a part of Assyria in the 370s.

Between 633-8, the region was invaded by the Arabs during the Muslim conquest of Persia; together with Meshan, it became the province of al-ʿIrāq. Asōristān was devolved by 639, bringing an end to over 3000 years of Assyria as a geopolitical entity, although it remained an ecclesiastical province within Syriac Christianity. A century later, the area became the capital province of the Abbasid Caliphate and the center of the Islamic Golden Age for five hundred years, from the 8th to the 13th centuries.

After the Muslim conquest, Asōristān saw a gradual but large influx of Muslim peoples; at first Arabs, but later also including Iranian (Kurdish) and Turkic peoples.

The Assyrian peoples continued to endure, rejecting Arabization and Islamization, and continued to form the majority population of the north as late as the 14th century, until the religiously-motivated massacres of Timur drastically reduced their numbers and led to the city of Assur being finally abandoned. After this period, the Assyrians became the ethnic, linguistic and religious minority in their homeland that they are to this day.

Population
The population of Asorestan was a mixed one, the Assyrians lived in the north while their brethren formerly known as Babylonians lived in the south, Nabateans dwelt in the far southwestern deserts, and minorities of Persians and Jews lived throughout Mesopotamia. The Greek element in the southern cities, still strong in the Parthian period, was absorbed by the Assyrians in Sasanian times. The majority of the population were Assyrian people as the name of the province implies, speaking Akkadian influenced Eastern Aramaic dialects, as did the Jews and Mandeans. As the breadbasket of the Sasanian Empire, most of the population were engaged in agriculture or worked as soldiers, traders and merchants. The Persians lived in various parts of the province; Persian garrison soldiers lived along the outer fringe of southern and western Asoristan, Persian noble families lived in the major cities, whilst some Persian peasants lived in the villages in the southern part. They played a very active role in the province, and were found in the administrative class of society, as army officers, civil servants, and feudal lords.

Language
At least three dialects of Eastern Aramaic were in spoken and liturgical use: Syriac mainly in the north and among Assyrian Christians (the terms Syrian and Syriac originally being Indo-European derivatives of Assyrian), Mandaic in the north and then south and among the Mandaeans, and a dialect in the central region, of which the Judaic subvariety is known as Jewish Babylonian Aramaic. In addition, the native population spoke colloquial dialects of Mesopotamian Eastern Aramaic (which was infused and influenced by Akkadian dialects), descended from the Imperial Aramaic introduced by Tiglath-pileser III as the lingua franca of Assyria and the Neo Assyrian Empire in the 8th century BC. These dialects survive to this day among the modern Assyrians, with estimates ranging from 577,000 to 1,000,000 fluent speakers, with a far smaller number of speakers of Mandaic still extant.

Aside from the liturgical scriptures of these religions which exist today, archaeological examples of all three of these dialects can be found in the collections of thousands of Aramaic incantation bowls—ceramic artifacts dated to this era—discovered in Iraq. While the Jewish Aramaic script retained the original "square" or "block" form of the Aramaic alphabet used in Imperial Aramaic (the Ashuri alphabet), the Syriac alphabet and the Mandaic alphabet developed when cursive styles of Aramaic began to appear. The Mandaic script itself developed from the Parthian chancellery script.

Religion
The religious demography of Mesopotamia was very diverse during Late Antiquity. From the 1st and 2nd centuries Syriac Christianity became the primary religion, while other groups practiced Mandaeism, Judaism, Manichaeism, Zoroastrianism, and the ancient Assyro-Babylonian Mesopotamian religion. Assyrian Christians were probably the most numerous group in the province.

Mesopotamian religion

The old Mesopotamian religion of the indigenous Assyrians and Babylonians remained strong in places, particularly in the north, in Assyria proper. Temples were still being dedicated to Ashur, Shamash, Ishtar, Sin, Hadad and Ninurta in Assur, Arbela, Edessa, Amid, Nohadra and Harran among other places, during the 3rd and 4th centuries AD, and traces would survive into the 10th century in remote parts of Assyria.

Christianity
Asorestan, and particularly Assyria proper, were the centers for the Church of the East (now split into the Assyrian Church of the East, the Ancient Church of the East and the Chaldean Catholic Church), which at one time extended far beyond the confines of the by then defunct Sasanian empire and was the most widespread Christian church in the world, reaching well into Central Asia, China, Mongolia Tibet and India. It sees as its founders the apostle Thomas (Mar Toma), and Saint Thaddeus (Mar Addai), and used the distinctly Syriac version of Eastern Aramaic for its scriptures and liturgy. The Holy Qurbana of Addai and Mari is one of the oldest Eucharistic prayers in Christianity, composed around the year 200 AD. The Church of the East was consolidated in 410 at the Council of Seleucia-Ctesiphon, held at the Sasanian capital, Selucia-Ctesiphon, which remained the seat of the Patriarchate of the Church of the East for over 600 years.

Mandaeism

The Mandaeans, who are according to their traditions the original followers of John the Baptist, are the last surviving Gnostics from antiquity. According to most scholars, Mandaeism originated sometime in the first three centuries CE, in either southwestern Mesopotamia or the Syro-Palestinian area. However, some scholars take the view that Mandaeism is older and dates from pre-Christian times. Mandaeans assert that their religion predates Judaism, Christianity, and Islam as a monotheistic faith. Their language and script is Mandaic, a form of Aramaic. Two of their important religious texts, written between the 1st and 3rd centuries, are the Ginza Rabba and the Mandaean Book of John (preserving original traditions about John the Baptist). The Mandaean population numbers between 60,000 to 100,000 today. Mandaeism flourished in the Parthian and early Sassanid period in the region.

Manichaeism
The religion of Manichaeism, founded by Mani (216–276), originated in 3rd century Asorestan, and spread across a vast geographical area. In some instances, Manichaeism even surpassed the Church of the East in its reach, as it was for a time also widespread in the Roman Empire. While none of the six original Syriac scriptures of the Manichaeans have survived in their entirety, a long Syriac section of one of their works detailing key beliefs was preserved by Theodore Bar Konai (a Church of the East author from Beth Garmaï), in his book Ketba Deskolion written in about 792. Like the Church of the East, the traditional center of the Manichaean church was in Seleucia-Ctesiphon. Mani dedicated his only Middle Persian writing, the Shāpuragān, to Shapur I.

Judaism
Babylonia remained the center of Judaism in the world. The major book defining Rabbinic Judaism, the Babylonian Talmud, was written in Jewish Babylonian Aramaic in Asorestan between the 3rd and 5th centuries. The Babylonian Talmudic academies were all established relatively near to Seleucia-Ctesiphon. The first Talmudic academy was founded in Sura by Rav (175–247) in about 220. One of the most influential Talmudic teachers, Rava (270–350), who was influenced by both Manichaean polemic and Zoroastrian theology, studied in another Talmudic academy at Pumbedita.

Zoroastrianism
The Sasanian state religion, Zoroastrianism, was largely confined to the Iranian administrative class, and did not filter down to the Assyrian population.

References

Sources

Further reading
 

Provinces of the Sasanian Empire
Ancient Upper Mesopotamia
States and territories established in the 3rd century
States and territories disestablished in the 7th century
Ctesiphon